The Starting a Business Index is a sub-index of the World Bank Ease of Doing Business Index.

Authors of the methodology 
This methodology was developed by Simeon Djankov, Rafael La Porta, Florencio Lopez-De-Silanes and Andrei Shleifer in a paper, "The Regulation of Entry".

Djankov is the creator of the annual Doing Business report, once a publication of the World Bank Group. The report was discontinued in 2021.

Ranking 
Ranking of all nations from 2010 report 
 The 2019 ranking has New Zealand at the top again.

See also
Barriers to entry
Commercial law

References 

World Bank
Business law
Economic indicators
International rankings

cs:Index snadnosti podnikání
id:Indeks Kemudahan Berbisnis
pl:Ease of Doing Business Index
vi:Chỉ số thuận lợi kinh doanh
zh:各国经商容易度列表